The Shadow Chief Secretary to the Treasury is the most junior member of the Shadow Cabinet, and is the deputy to the Shadow Chancellor of the Exchequer. The Shadow Chief Secretary to the Treasury acts as the primary opposition to the equivalent Governmental position, the Chief Secretary to the Treasury, who is deputy to the Chancellor of the Exchequer. Currently the position of Shadow Chief Secretary to the Treasury is held by Pat McFadden of the Labour Party.

List of Shadow Chief Secretary to the Treasury

 Joel Barnett (4 May 1979 - 14 July 1979)

References 

Official Opposition (United Kingdom)